Chester Franciscan Friary was a friary in Chester, England. It was established in the 1230s, and dissolved in 1538.

References

Monasteries in Cheshire
Franciscan monasteries in England
1230s establishments in England
Christian monasteries established in the 13th century
1538 disestablishments in England
History of Chester